The Return of the Antelope was a UK TV series aired on ITV between 1986 and 1988.  It was a children's fantasy series about two English children, circa 1899, who befriend a group of shipwrecked Lilliputians.

Production
Producer/Director: Eugene Ferguson
Writer: Willis Hall

Cast
 Julie Shipley /  Nanny (2 episodes, 1986) 
 Gail Harrison /  Brelca 1 (1986) (Seasons 1-2) 
 Annie Hulley /  Brelca 2 (1988) (Seasons 3-4) 
 John Quentin /  Fistram 
 John Branwell /  Spelbush 
 Alan Bowyer /  Gerald 
 Claudia Gambold /  Philippa 
 Paul Chapman /  Harwell Mincing 
 Stephanie Cole /  Sarah Mincing  
 Derek Farr /  Mr. Garstanton (1986) (Seasons 1-2) 
 Richard Vernon /  Mr. Garstanton (1988) (Seasons 3-4) 
 Fiona McArthur /  Millie  
 Erica Sail /  Emily Wilkins (1988) (Seasons 3-4) 
 Garry Halliday /  Ernest (1988) (Seasons 3-4)
 Robert Moore / Edwin (1988) (Season 3, episodes 4 & 5)

Episode list
Season 1, Episode 1: Castaways
Season 1, Episode 2: Lost and Found
Season 1, Episode 3: Studio Portraits
Season 1, Episode 4: Piano Lessons
Season 1, Episode 5: Everything in the Garden
Season 1, Episode 6: Where the Heart Is
Season 2, Episode 1: Brelca Goes Ballooning
Season 2, Episode 2: Philippa's Brave Deed
Season 2, Episode 3: Pagoda of Doom
Season 2, Episode 4: The Lost Park
Season 2, Episode 5: The Bottle of Amontillado
Season 2, Episode 6: Mrs Mallarby's Day
Season 2, Episode 7: Moving On
Season 2, Episode 8: The Antelope Christmas
Season 3, Episode 1: Travelling Companions
Season 3, Episode 2: Home Again
Season 3, Episode 3: Emily
Season 3, Episode 4: Back to the Sea
Season 3, Episode 5: Footprints in the Sand
Season 3, Episode 6: Sea Fever
Season 3, Episode 7: That's the Way to Do It!
Season 4, Episode 1: Military Manoeuvres
Season 4, Episode 2: The Secret of the Municipal Museum
Season 4, Episode 3: Municipal Museum Hide and Seek
Season 4, Episode 4: Brave Deeds and Gallant Actions
Season 4, Episode 5: The Stuff That Dreams Are Made Of
Season 4, Episode 6: Bonfire Celebrations

References

 BFI database entry

ITV children's television shows
1986 British television series debuts
1988 British television series endings
Television series set in the 1890s
Television shows produced by Granada Television
English-language television shows